American singer Billy Gilman has released six studio albums, two compilation album, 36 singles, and twelve music videos, as well as other charted songs and non-album releases.

Albums

Studio albums

Compilation albums

Extended plays

Singles

As lead artist

As featured artist

Promotional singles
"I Know" (MySpace, 2009)
"She Wanted More" (MySpace, 2009)
"Honky Tonk Parade" (MySpace, 2009)
"I've Changed" (MySpace, 2009)
"Red to Blue" (YouTube, 2016)

Releases from The Voice

Compilation albums

Singles

Music videos

Notes

References

External links
 Billy Gilman at AllMusic

Country music discographies
Pop music discographies
Discographies of American artists